Aguaje Draw is a valley and a tributary stream of the Little Colorado River in Apache County, Arizona and Valencia County, New Mexico.

References 

Rivers of Apache County, Arizona
Rivers of Valencia County, New Mexico
Rivers of Arizona